Thomas Kelly College Preparatory High School  is a public 4–year high school located in the Brighton Park neighborhood on the southwest side of Chicago, Illinois, United States. The school is named for Irish nationalist Thomas J. Kelly. Kelly is the third largest Chicago public high school in terms of student population. Over 80% of students are Hispanic. The school's team name is Trojans. Opened in 1928, Kelly is a part of the Chicago Public Schools district.

History
Kelly opened its doors as a junior high school on December 3, 1928, only serving grades six through ninth. On July 12, 1933, the Chicago Board of Education abolished all junior high schools in Chicago, and on September 17, 1933, for the 1933–34 school year; Kelly reopened as a senior high school.

Athletics
Kelly competes in the Chicago Public League (CPL) and is a member of the Illinois High School Association (IHSA).

Notable alumni
 Lenny Gomulka – Professional Polka Bandleader and Musician
 Kevin Hickey – Major League Pitcher for the Chicago White Sox and the Baltimore Orioles
 Ron Masak - American Actor
 John Joseph Ryba – former Wisconsin state representative (1993–2003)
 Joe Young – 1952, former American football defensive end in the early American Football League

References

	

Public high schools in Chicago
Educational institutions established in 1928
1928 establishments in Illinois